Bomarea chimborazensis is a species of flowering plant in the family Alstroemeriaceae. It is endemic to Ecuador. It is a plant of páramo habitat. It is threatened by fires set by people.

References

chimborazensis
Endemic flora of Ecuador
Endangered plants
Páramo flora
Taxonomy articles created by Polbot